Via Cavour is a street in the Castro Pretorio and Monti rioni of Rome, named after Camillo Cavour. It is served by the Rome Metro stations Cavour and Termini. The facade of the original permanent Roma Termini railway station reached this street, though it is now 200 metres farther back towards the Esquiline. The street houses a large number of hotels and restaurants.

See also
Via Cavour in Florence

External links

Storia di Via Cavour

References

Streets in Rome R. I Monti